Walter Johnston (17 January 1884 – 18 July 1946) was an Australian rules footballer who played one game for the Richmond Football Club in the Victorian Football League (VFL) in 1908. 

Until 2018, this game had been incorrectly allocated to Alex Johnston.

Johnston served in the Australian army during World War II, despite being 56 years old by falsifying his birth day to 1 January 1896.

Notes

External links 
		

1884 births
1946 deaths
Australian rules footballers from Victoria (Australia)
Richmond Football Club players